Newry and Mourne District Council was a local council in Northern Ireland. It merged with Down District Council in May 2015 under local government reorganisation in Northern Ireland to become Newry, Mourne and Down District Council.

It included much of the south of County Armagh and the south of County Down and had a population of over 99,000. Council headquarters were in Newry, the largest settlement and only city in the area; it has a population of 28,850. Other towns in the council area included Crossmaglen and Bessbrook in County Armagh and Warrenpoint, Rostrevor, Hilltown, Annalong and Kilkeel (an important fishing port) in Down.

The council was formed in 1973 under the Local Government Act (Northern Ireland) 1972.  Its area was formed from Kilkeel, Newry and Warrenpoint Urban Districts and Kilkeel and Newry No. 1 Rural Districts in County Down, and from Newry No. 2 Rural District in County Armagh.  From 1973 to 1985, the council area consisted of six electoral areas. In 1985, this was reduced to five electoral areas: Crotlieve, Fews, Newry Town, Slieve Gullion and The Mournes. One of its 30 wards, Rathfriland, was transferred to Banbridge Council in 1993. At the elections of 2005, 30 members were elected from the following political parties: 14 Sinn Féin, 9 Social Democratic and Labour Party (SDLP), 3 Ulster Unionist Party (UUP), 1 Democratic Unionist Party (DUP), 2 Independents and 1 United Kingdom Independence Party (UKIP).

2014 criticism
In April 2014 the Equality Commission for Northern Ireland criticised Newry and Mourne District Council for retaining the name of a children's play park called after the IRA hunger striker, Raymond McCreesh. McCreesh had been arrested with a weapon used in the infamous Kingsmill massacre of Protestant workmen. Twenty nationalist councillors - including six (non-republican) SDLP representatives - voted to uphold his name in the December 2012 vote, but unionists campaigned against the decision. The Equality Commission concluded that their investigation has found that little consideration appears to have been given by the council to the impact its decision, in this instance, might have on Ulster Protestants/unionists or to the damage it might cause to good relations

2011 election results
In elections for the Westminster Parliament and the Northern Ireland Assembly it is split between the Newry & Armagh constituency and the South Down constituency.

2005 election results

  includes Henry Reilly, a member of the United Kingdom Independence Party (UKIP) who defected in February 2007 from the Ulster Unionist Party (UUP).

Mayor of Newry

The title Mayor of Newry replace the office of Chairman of Newry & Mourne District Council after Newry's elevation to city status in 2002.

2003: Frank Feely, Social Democratic and Labour Party
2003 – 04: Jackie Patterson, Independent
2004 – 05: Henry Reilly, Ulster Unionist Party
2005 – 06: Pat McGinn, Sinn Féin
2006 – 07: Michael Carr, Social Democratic and Labour Party
2007 – 08: Michael Cole, Social Democratic and Labour Party
2008 – 09: Colman Burns, Sinn Féin
2009 – 10: John Feehan Social Democratic and Labour Party
2010 – 11: Mick Murphy, Sinn Féin
2011 – 12: Charlie Casey Sinn Féin
2012 – 13: John McArdle Social Democratic and Labour Party
2013 - 14: Michael Ruane Sinn Féin
2014 - 15: Dáire Hughes Sinn Féin
2018 - 19: Mark Murnin Social Democratic and Labour Party
2019 – 20: Charlie Casey Sinn Féin

Deputy Mayor of Newry
2005 - 06: Michael Carr, Social Democratic and Labour Party
2006 - 07: Martin Connolly, Sinn Féin
2007 - 08: Charlie Casey, Sinn Féin
2008 - 09: Isaac Hannah, Ulster Unionist Party
2009 - 10: Charlie Casey, Sinn Féin
2010 - 11: Karen McKevitt, Social Democratic and Labour Party
2011 - 12: Geraldine Donnelly, Social Democratic and Labour Party
2012 - 13: Patrick McDonald, Sinn Féin
2013 - 14: David Taylor, Ulster Unionist Party 
2014 - 15: Brain Quinn, Social Democratic and Labour Party

Review of Public Administration
Under the Review of Public Administration (RPA) the council was due to merge with Down District Council in 2011 to form a single council for the enlarged area totalling 1539 km2 and a population of 150,886. The next election was due to take place in May 2009, but on 25 April 2008, Shaun Woodward, Secretary of State for Northern Ireland announced that the scheduled 2009 district council elections were to be postponed until the introduction of the eleven new councils in 2011. The merger ultimately took place in April 2015 to form Newry City, Mourne and Down District Council.

Population
The area covered by Newry and Mourne District Council had a population of 99,480 residents according to the 2011 Northern Ireland census.

See also
 Local Councils in Northern Ireland
 Viscount Newry and Mourne is the courtesy title of the Earl of Kilmorey.

References

External links
Newry and Mourne District Council

 
Politics of County Armagh
Politics of County Down
Newry
District councils of Northern Ireland, 1973–2015